Narsingrao Sheshrao Deshmukh is a politician and a member of the Indian National Congress, and son of Sheshrao Deshmukh. He was a two-time member of the Maharashtra Legislative Assembly from the Achalpur constituency.

References

Possibly living people
Year of birth missing
Indian National Congress politicians from Maharashtra